Salvatore Totino,  (born November 2, 1964) is an American cinematographer, known for his collaborations with director Ron Howard. He was invited to join AMPAS in 2006, and has been a member of the American Society of Cinematographers (ASC) since 2007 and the Italian Society of Cinematographers since 2011. In additional to feature films, he has shot numerous music videos and television commercials.

Filmography

Film

Television

Music videos

References

External links
http://www.skouras.com/dps/totino/Totino%20Sal.pdf

1964 births
Living people
American cinematographers
American people of Italian descent